Alexander Wefald (born November 25, 1978) is a Norwegian sprint canoer who competed in the mid-2000s. He finished fifth in the K-4 1000 m event at the 2004 Summer Olympics in Athens.

References
Sports-Reference.com profile

External links

1978 births
Canoeists at the 2004 Summer Olympics
Living people
Olympic canoeists of Norway
Norwegian male canoeists
Place of birth missing (living people)